Agreia is a genus in the phylum Actinomycetota (Bacteria).

Etymology
The generic name Agreia honours Nina S. Agre, a Russian microbiologist.

Species
The genus contains two species:
 A. bicolorata Evtushenko et al. 2001, type species of the genus; Latin bis, twice;  coloratus, coloured; to give bicolorata, two-coloured.)
 A. pratensis (Behrendt et al. 2002) Schumann et al. 2003; Latin pratensis, found in meadows/grassland]

See also
 Bacterial taxonomy
 Microbiology

References 

Bacteria genera
Microbacteriaceae